Mushtaq Ahmad or Ahmed may refer to:

 Mushtaq Ahmad (Lord Lieutenant) (born 1942), Lord Lieutenant of Lanarkshire
 Mushtaq Ahmad (field hockey, born 1932) (1932–2011), field hockey striker from Pakistan
 Mushtaq Ahmad (field hockey, born 1956), field hockey forward from Pakistan
 Mushtaq Ahmed (cricketer) (born 1970), Pakistani Test cricketer
 Mushtaq Ahmed (lynching victim) (1980–2022) 
 Mushtaq Ahmed (politician) (c. 1918–1996), interim President of Bangladesh, 1975
 Mushtaq Ahmed (writer) (1967–2021), Bangladeshi dissident writer, and entrepreneur